ten Heuvel is a rather uncommon Dutch toponymic surname meaning "on the hill". It may refer to:

Arturo ten Heuvel (born 1978), Dutch footballer
Laurens ten Heuvel (born 1976), Dutch footballer

References

See also
Van den Heuvel, a more common Dutch surname with a similar meaning

Dutch-language surnames
Toponymic surnames